Elections to Coleraine Borough Council were held on 30 May 1973 on the same day as the other Northern Irish local government elections. The election used three district electoral areas to elect a total of 20 councillors.

Election results

Districts summary

|- class="unsortable" align="centre"
!rowspan=2 align="left"|Ward
! % 
!Cllrs
! % 
!Cllrs
! %
!Cllrs
! %
!Cllrs
!rowspan=2|TotalCllrs
|- class="unsortable" align="center"
!colspan=2 bgcolor="" | UUP
!colspan=2 bgcolor="" | Alliance
!colspan=2 bgcolor="" | SDLP
!colspan=2 bgcolor="white"| Others
|-
|align="left"|Area A
|bgcolor="40BFF5"|51.8
|bgcolor="40BFF5"|4
|4.7
|0
|15.9
|1
|27.6
|1
|6
|-
|align="left"|Area B
|bgcolor="40BFF5"|63.4
|bgcolor="40BFF5"|5
|21.3
|2
|5.3
|0
|10.0
|0
|7
|-
|align="left"|Area C
|bgcolor="40BFF5"|56.1
|bgcolor="40BFF5"|4
|13.1
|1
|0.0
|0
|30.8
|2
|7
|-
|- class="unsortable" class="sortbottom" style="background:#C9C9C9"
|align="left"| Total
|57.2
|13
|13.2
|3
|6.8
|1
|22.8
|3
|20
|-
|}

Districts results

Area A

1973: 4 x UUP, 1 x SDLP, 1 x Independent Unionist

Area B

1973: 5 x UUP, 2 x Alliance

Area C

1973: 4 x UUP, 2 x Independent, 1 x Alliance

References

Coleraine Borough Council elections
Coleraine